This is a list of countries by the proportion of their population using improved sanitation facilities.

Methods

Figures used in this chart are based on data compiled and uploaded by the World Bank in May 2013 through their World Development Indicators initiative.  The information was provided by the respective governments of the listed countries.  As the compiled figures are not collected with the same methodology and with different levels of rigor, there are limitations in their reliability in forming comparisons.

Sanitation as defined by the World Health Organization:

The United Nations states that improved sanitation facilities "ensure hygienic separation of human excreta from human contact." They include in their definition:

The Joint Monitoring Programme for Water Supply and Sanitation of WHO and UNICEF has defined improved sanitation as follows:

 Flush toilet
 Connection to a piped sewer system
 Connection to a septic system
 Flush / pour-flush to a pit latrine
 Ventilated improved pit (VIP) latrine
 Pit latrine with slab
 Composting toilet
 Some special cases

The World Bank states:

Countries
The following Table is based on The World Bank basic sanitation DataBank.

See also
Sanitation
Toilet
List of responsibilities in the water supply and sanitation sector in Latin America and the Caribbean
Water supply and sanitation in Sub-Saharan Africa

References

Water supply and sanitation by country
Sanitation
Sanitation